Kahlwan  is a village in Jalandhar district of Punjab State, India. The village is administrated by a Sarpanch who is an elected representative of village as per the constitution of India and Panchayati raj (India).
Khalwan is famous for being the birthplace and area of activity of notorious gangster Sukha Khalwan.This village is also linked with Sardar Lehna Singh Kahlon of the Bhangi Misl, who ruled Lahore between 1765 to 1797 and his son Chet who ruled for 2 years before losing Lahore to Maharaja Ranjit Singh - the Kahlons in this village are from his Tubbar (clan) as the Jathera of people in Kahlwan is Village Saidowal near Gurdaspur which is where Lehna’s grandfather came from with the mother village in Kartarpur being Mustfapur which is where the grandfather settled - see Sir Leppel Griffin’s Panjab Chiefs under Bhangi Sardars.

Demography 
According to the report published by Census India in 2011, Kahlwan has 162 houses with the total population of 818 persons of which 438 are male and 380 females. Literacy rate of  Kahlwan is 75.27%, lower than the state average of 75.84%.  The population of children in the age group 0–6 years is 86 which is 10.51% of the total population.  Child sex ratio is approximately 686, lower than the state average of 846.

Population data

References

External links 
  Villages in Kapurthala
 Kapurthala Villages List

Villages in Kapurthala district